is a former Japanese football player.

Playing career
Mizutani was born in Tokyo on May 26, 1980. After dropped out from Kanto Gakuin University, he joined J1 League club Bellmare Hiratsuka (later Shonan Bellmare) in August 1999. Although he debuted in October 1999, the club was relegated to J2 League from 2000. In 2000, he battles with new member Yuji Ito for regular goalkeeper and he played many matches. In 2001, he moved to Avispa Fukuoka. However he could not play at all in the match and the club was relegated to J2 from 2002. In 2002, he moved to J2 club Cerezo Osaka on loan. However he could not play at all in the match. In 2003, he returned to Avispa Fukuoka. In 2003, he battles with Hideki Tsukamoto for the position and played many matches. From 2004, he completely became a regular goalkeeper and the club was promoted to J1 from 2006. In 2007, he moved to Kashiwa Reysol. However he could hardly play in the match behind Yuta Minami. In 2008, he moved to Kyoto Sanga FC. He played many matches as regular goalkeeper. In late 2010, he could not play at all in the match behind Tatsuya Morita and the club was relegated to J2 from 2011. From 2011, he became a regular goalkeeper again. In 2013, he moved to J2 club Avispa Fukuoka for the first time in 7 years. Although he played as regular goalkeeper, he got hurt in June and could hardly play in the match after that. In 2014, he moved to J2 club Kataller Toyama. Although he played as regular goalkeeper in early, he could not play at all in the match behind Tatsumi Iida and Ryotaro Hironaga from June and he retired end of 2014 season.

Club statistics

References

External links

1980 births
Living people
Kanto Gakuin University alumni
Association football people from Tokyo
Japanese footballers
J1 League players
J2 League players
Shonan Bellmare players
Avispa Fukuoka players
Cerezo Osaka players
Kashiwa Reysol players
Kyoto Sanga FC players
Kataller Toyama players
Association football goalkeepers